Marschall v Land Nordrhein Westfalen (1997) C-409/95 is a German and EU labour law case concerning positive action.

Facts
Marschall was a teacher. He applied for promotion and did not get it and a woman did. The school's rules allowed for promotion of women 'unless reasons specific to an individual candidate tilt the balance in his favour'. He sought an order that he was in fact appointed. The Verwaltungsgericht Gelsenkirchen made a reference to the ECJ asking whether the rule was compatible with the Equal Treatment Directive 76/207/EC art 2(1) and 2(4).

Advocate General Jacobs gave his opinion that the rule in question was compatible with EU law.

Judgment
The European Court of Justice held that positive action was lawful if (1) the employer had a 'saving clause' so it could take into account objective factors specific to an individual man (2) the criteria in such a procedure did not discriminate against female candidates. The art 2(4) derogation could be triggered where positive action aimed to counteract 'the prejudicial effects on female candidates' of stereotyped attitudes about women at work.

See also

Notes

References

1997 in the European Union
German case law
Court of Justice of the European Union case law
1997 in case law
1997 in Germany
European Union labour case law
1990s in North Rhine-Westphalia
November 1997 events in Europe